Annemarie Kleinert-Ludwig (born 1 February 1947, Geseke) is a German writer and historian. She has taught history at the Free University of Berlin, Leibniz University Hannover, and the University of California, San Diego, and now works as a freelance writer.

Her first book investigated the history of French women's magazines in the 18th and 19th centuries, up to 1848. Her second book was a biography of the prima ballerina Eva Evdokimova, who died in 2009. A subsequent work presented the history of the Berlin Philharmonic under conductors Herbert von Karajan to Simon Rattle, and has been translated into German and Japanese.

She has written a number of scientific articles, and discovered previously unknown early works by the French author Honoré de Balzac.

She has been married to physicist Hagen Kleinert since May 30, 1974, and they have one son.

Books 
 Die frühen Modejournale in Frankreich, E. Schmidt, Berlin 1980 (Studienreihe Romania) 
 Portrait of an Artist: Eva Evdokimova, Dance Books, London 1982 
 Le Journal des Dames et des Modes ou la Conquète de l'Europe Fèminine (1797 - 1839), Thorbecke, Stuttgart 2001 
 Music at its Best: The Berlin Philharmonic - From Karajan to Rattle, Books on Demand (2009)

References

External links 
Personal homepage
Balzac - erst Publizist, dann Schriftsteller. Die Jugendjahre von 1819 bis 1822.

1947 births
Living people
21st-century German historians
20th-century German historians
German women historians
People from Geseke